Helmut Redl (born 17 September 1939) is a retired Austrian football forward who played for Austria. He also played for 1. Simmeringer SC, Wacker Innsbruck, SV Wattens, SK Rapid Wien and Alpine Donawitz.

External links

 
 

1939 births
Austrian footballers
Austria international footballers
Association football defenders
1. Simmeringer SC players
WSG Tirol players
FC Wacker Innsbruck players
SK Rapid Wien players
DSV Leoben players
Living people